Clinton Paulson Stephens (1919-1995), was a male United States badminton player.

Profile
After gaining a degree at the City College of New York in 1938 Stephens served in the US Army and was awarded two bronze stars. He married Patricia Roberts in 1948.
After retiring he worked as an investment banker.

Badminton career
Stephens won the mixed doubles in 1949 All England Badminton Championships with his wife Patricia Stephens.
Stephens also won a bronze medal in the 1949 Thomas Cup and the mixed doubles in the 1948 U.S. National Badminton Championships.

References

American male badminton players
1919 births
1995 deaths
United States Army personnel of World War II